Andingmen Subdistrict (Chinese: 安定门街道) is a subdistrict in the northwestern part of Dongcheng District, Beijing, China. It contains 9 communities, covers 1.74 squared kilometers of land, and has a population of 32,172 by the year 2020.

This subdistrict was named after Andingmen, a gate of the Beijing city wall that once stood in this area.

History

Administrative Division 

As of 2021, there are 9 communities in Andingmen:

Famous Sites 
 Imperial Academy
 Drum Tower and Bell Tower
 Beijing Temple of Confucius

See also 
 List of township-level divisions of Beijing

References 

Dongcheng District, Beijing
Subdistricts of Beijing